Ismael Cortinas (1884–1940) was a Uruguayan political figure, journalist and playwright.

Background

Ismael Cortinas was born on 17 June 1884 in San José de Mayo, Uruguay,  son of Miguel Cortinas and Laura Ventura Peláez Maciel. He went to Universidad de la República (University of the Republic of Uruguay) but never graduated.

Cortinas was a journalist by profession.

He also wrote plays, including the comedy 'La rosa natural'.
He was one of several Uruguayan authors who flourished in Buenos Aires during the period of realism in rioplatense theater at the turn of the 20th century, others being Otto Miguel Cione (1875–1945), Edmundo Bianchi (1880–1965) and Orosmán Moratorio (1883–1929).

Cortinas died in Montevideo in 1940

Political career

Cortinas served as a Deputy of the Republic from 1915 to 1925, as a member of the National Party (Uruguay).

He subsequently served as a Senator of the Republic from 1925 to 1929, and served as the President of the Senate in 1929.

He was a member of the National Council of Administration from 1929 to 1933. He was noted for his differences with President of Uruguay Gabriel Terra especially from 1933 onwards.

Disambiguation and legacy

His name is not to be confused with the town of Ismael Cortinas, in Flores Department, which was named after him in 1950.

See also

 Politics of Uruguay
 List of Uruguayan writers

References

Sources

Uruguayan dramatists and playwrights
Male dramatists and playwrights
People from San José de Mayo
1884 births
1940 deaths
National Party (Uruguay) politicians
Presidents of the Senate of Uruguay
Members of the Chamber of Representatives of Uruguay
20th-century dramatists and playwrights
20th-century Uruguayan male writers